Sandhuravirey is a 2002 Maldivian horror film directed by Amjad Ibrahim. Produced by Hassan Ali under Dash Studio, the film stars Yoosuf Shafeeu and Mariyam Nisha in pivotal roles.

Premise
Dhiyash (Yoosuf Shafeeu), a poor young boy who lives in a hut with his father, meets a beautiful lady, Yaasha (Mariyam Nisha) at the beach. They instantly like each other and starts dating before she reveals herself to be a jinn. Deceived, Dhiyash calls their relationship off and warns her not to meet him ever again. Yaasha, later disguised as a wise woman, Zaleesha (Mariyam Haleem) helped him to learn basic elements needed for opening a business and indirectly assists him in locating and selling an ambergris. Five years later, Dhiyas, now a successful businessman is introduced to a needy family; Naha (Khadheeja Mohamed) and her kid, Lauza, whom later revealed to be Yaasha disguised as another woman where Lauza was discovered to be their own child.

Cast 
 Yoosuf Shafeeu as Dhiyash
 Mariyam Nisha as Shafqa / Yaasha
 Khadheeja Mohamed as Naha
 Neena Saleem as Jauza
 Ahmed Moosa as Viaam
 Suneetha Ali as Safa
 Mariyam Haleem as Zaleesha
 Raisa as Lauza

Soundtrack

References

2002 films
2002 horror films
Maldivian horror films
Films directed by Amjad Ibrahim